Gega Point  (‘Nos Gega’ \'nos 'ge-ga\) is a point on the west coast of Astrolabe Island in Bransfield Strait off Trinity Peninsula, Antarctica forming the southeast side of the entrance to Mokren Bight.

The point is named after the settlement of Gega in southwestern Bulgaria.

Location
German-British mapping in 1996.

Maps
 Trinity Peninsula. Scale 1:250000 topographic map No. 5697. Institut für Angewandte Geodäsie and British Antarctic Survey, 1996.
 Antarctic Digital Database (ADD). Scale 1:250000 topographic map of Antarctica. Scientific Committee on Antarctic Research (SCAR), 1993–2016.

References
 Gega Point. SCAR Composite Gazetteer of Antarctica.
 Bulgarian Antarctic Gazetteer. Antarctic Place-names Commission. (details in Bulgarian, basic data in English)

External links
 Gega Point. Copernix satellite image

Headlands of Trinity Peninsula
Bulgaria and the Antarctic
Astrolabe Island